The 1884 United States presidential election in Minnesota took place on November 4, 1884, as part of the 1884 United States presidential election. Voters chose seven representatives, or electors to the Electoral College, who voted for president and vice president.

Minnesota was won by Republican nominee, James G. Blaine, over the Democratic nominee, Grover Cleveland. Blaine won the state by a margin of 21.91%.

With 58.78% of the popular vote, Minnesota would prove to be Blaine's second strongest victory in terms of percentage in the popular vote after Vermont.

Results

See also
 United States presidential elections in Minnesota

References

Minnesota
1884
1884 Minnesota elections